Fort Defiance was built by General "Mad" Anthony Wayne in the second week of August 1794 at the confluence of the Auglaize and Maumee rivers. It was the one of a line of defenses constructed by American forces in the campaign leading to the Northwest Indian War's Battle of Fallen Timbers on August 20, 1794.

Work began on August 9, 1794 and was completed by August 17. The name was derived from a declaration by Charles Scott, who was leading a band of Kentucky militiamen in support of Wayne, that: "I defy the English, Indians, and all the devils of hell to take it."  The post was considered one of the strongest fortifications built in that period.

Following the Battle of Fallen Timbers, Wayne ordered the destruction of all Native American villages and their crops within a  radius of the fort. Under terms of the Treaty of Greenville, signed on August 3, 1795, the native nations ceded six square miles around the fort and allowed the Americans to maintain a trading post there, even though it was within the area of land defined by the "Greenville Treaty Line", beyond which Americans had agreed not to settle. The fort was abandoned in 1796.

Fort Winchester was constructed on a nearby site in 1812 by Gen. William Henry Harrison.

The city of Defiance, Ohio, was founded at the fort's location in 1822. In 1904, the site of the fort was chosen for the Defiance Public Library.

Fort Defiance served as a reference point for defining the boundary line of land cession in the Treaty of Detroit in 1807.  This north–south line would be used again as the Michigan Meridian in the survey of lands in Michigan.

Today, a park occupies the site of the fort, which was added to the National Register of Historic Places in 1980.

References

Catalano, Joshua (2019). "Blue Jacket, Anthony Wayne, and the Psychological and Symbolic War for Ohio, 1790-1795". Ohio History. 126 (1): 5-34.

External links

Ohio History Central
History of Fort Defiance
Fort Defiance in the War of 1812
An Ohio History Travelogue
Photos and visiting information

Defiance
Northwest Indian War
Defiance
1794 establishments in the Northwest Territory
Protected areas of Defiance County, Ohio
National Register of Historic Places in Defiance County, Ohio
Pre-statehood history of Ohio
Parks in Ohio
Defiance
Defiance, Ohio